Mannboro is a rural unincorporated community in eastern Amelia County in the U.S. state of Virginia. It is located along SR 612 (Richmond Road) at its split and curve junctions with SR 708 (Namozine Road).

Early spellings of the name included "Mannborough" and "Mannsborough"; in 1829 a post office was established under the name "Mannsboro", one of the first in Amelia County. The post office in present-day Mannboro (ZIP code 23105), however, now serves only the immediate vicinity; surrounding areas are served by the post office at Amelia Court House (ZIP code 23002), approximately 14 miles northwest. Amelia County Volunteer Fire Department Station 2 is also located within community limits.

Mannboro lies along the route followed by Confederate general Robert E. Lee and his army in their westward retreat during the final days of the Civil War. Confederate forces, hoping to reach a promised delivery of badly needed rations at the Court House rail depot, had just fought an inconclusive battle at Namozine Church, 6 miles east, on April 3. Lee surrendered to Ulysses S. Grant at Appomattox on April 9, 1865.

Mannboro School, built around 1925 or 1926, was among several Rosenwald Schools in Amelia County. The particular design for Mannboro called for a 2acre site with a schoolhouse to accommodate two teachers. During the early 20th century, the Rosenwald School project was a collaborative effort that built thousands of facilities across the South primarily for the education of African American children. As late as 1967, after desegregation, a campus named Mannboro School, alternatively called Amelia Academy, continued to operate on Route 612.

References

Unincorporated communities in Virginia
Unincorporated communities in Amelia County, Virginia